Harsh Khurana is an Indian film & television actor.

Television

1997–2002 Amanat as Rohan
1997–1999 Saturday Suspense Various Episodes
2000 Yeh Nazdeekiyan as Manav
2000–2004 Sonpari as Deepak
2001  Kutumb as Manav
2003 Kise Apna Kahein as Arshad
2010–2011 Ring Wrong Ring as Raj
2011–2012 Chintu Chinki Aur Ek Badi Si Love Story as Chintu's Fufaji(Chintu's Uncle)
2012–2014 Jeannie Aur Juju as Vela
2003–Present Crime Patrol as Various characters
2014 Tu Mere Agal Bagal Hai as Producer
2014–2016 Neeli Chhatri Wale
2015 Peterson Hill''' as Rahul Cheater/ Chor
2015–2016 Chalti Ka Naam Gaadi...Let's Go'' as Prem Chopra

Films
88 Antop Hill (2003) as Aslam Durrani 
The Legend of Bhagat Singh (2002) as Jai Gopal 
Chal Man Jeetva Jaiye as Niranjan Sanghvi

References

External links

Living people
Indian male film actors
Indian male television actors
Indian male soap opera actors
21st-century Indian male actors
Year of birth missing (living people)